Levinas is a surname. Notable people with the surname include:

 Emmanuel Levinas (1906–1995), French philosopher
 Michaël Lévinas (born 1949), French composer, son of Emmanuel
 Danielle Cohen-Levinas (born 1959), French musicologist and philosopher, wife of Michaël

See also
 Levina